The Toledo Blades and Hornets were the International Hockey League franchise of Toledo, Ohio from 1963 to 1974. The first four years (1959-1963) of the franchise was in Omaha, NE as the Omaha Knights.  After moving to Toledo for the 1963-64 season, they were renamed the Blades. The team name was changed to Hornets in 1970.  The franchise left Toledo after the 1973–74 season for Lansing, MI, where they became the Lansing Lancers.

The Blades were the Regular Season Champions in 1963–64, with 86 points and were awarded the Huber Trophy. The Blades won the Turner Cup in 1964 and 1967.

The Leading Rookie Award was awarded to Blades players Don Westbrook in 1964, Bob Thomas in 1965, and Wayne Zuk in 1970.

Blades goaltender, Glenn Ramsay, won the James Norris Memorial Trophy for the fewest goals against during the 1963–64 regular season, his third Norris Trophy in a row.  Glenn also won his sixth and final Norris Trophy in 1967.

In 1965, team captain, William "Chick" Chalmers, was awarded the James Gatschene Memorial Trophy, for the player voted most valuable through his display of outstanding playing ability and sportsmanlike conduct over the course of the regular season by the league coaches.

After the Hornets left in 1974, the IHL awarded a new franchise to Toledo, the Goaldiggers.

Season-by-season record

Franchise records

All-time leaders

References

External links
A to Z Encyclopaedia of Ice Hockey Toledo Blades/Hornets History
Blades Game Pucks

International Hockey League (1945–2001) teams
Sports teams in Toledo, Ohio
Defunct ice hockey teams in the United States
Ice hockey clubs established in 1963
Ice hockey clubs disestablished in 1970
1963 establishments in Ohio
1970 disestablishments in Ohio